Stellah Nantumbwe also Stella Nantumbwe, but commonly known as Ellah is a Ugandan actress, media personality, and former 2013/2014 Miss Uganda. She was Uganda's representative to the Big Brother Africa, in 2014.

Background and education
She was born in Uganda to Angella Nakiyonga and Rogers Nsereko, circa 1991. She is the last born, in a family of twelve children. Stella attended Buganda Road Primary School and Kabojja Junior School for her elementary schooling. She transferred to Kabojja International Secondary School for her O-Level education. The studied at Vienna College Namugongo, for her A-Level studies. She then joined the University of Greenwich in East London, in the United Kingdom, graduating with a Bachelor of Science degree in Business Computing, in 2012.

Career
In 2013, at the age of twenty two, Ellah auditioned for Miss Uganda and was crowned Miss Uganda Central Region. At the national beauty pageant competition, held at the Kampala Serena Hotel. On 13 July 2014, Stellar won the Miss Uganda crown and was also voted Miss Popularity. In September 2013, Stella represented Uganda at Miss World 2013, in Bali, Indonesia.

She represented Uganda on season nine of Big Brother Africa in 2014 and was evicted in the elimination process before the unveiling of the winner.

Ellah has also worked in film and television as an actress and presenter. She played the lead role of Isabella Arroyo in the Ugandan version of El Cuerpo del Deseo from 2016 to 2017. The series was nominated at Uganda Entertainment Awards in 2017 for Best TV Series. She has also played supporting roles in other films and television series in Uganda and Nigeria. She played a supporting role in Bella, a Matt Bish film in 2017. She also guest presented Scoop on Scoop on Urban TV in 2018.

Ellah also coaches beauty pageants and models. She has herself modeled for a number of brands. She was one of the judges on Miss Uganda 2018. She is also the vice president of Africa Music Industry Awards (AMI Awards) since 2018.

Filmography

References

External links
 Miss Uganda Stellah Nantumbwe is Uganda’s Big Brother Africa Representative As at 14 September 2014.
 Miss Uganda Stella Nantumbwe’s personal style As of 12 July 2014.
 Style tips for women with ample cleavage As of 25 March 2018.

Living people
1991 births
Ganda people
People from Kampala
Miss World 2013 delegates
Ugandan actresses
People from Central Region, Uganda